Battulga (Mongolian: Баттулга) is a Mongolian masculine given name that may refer to
Khaltmaagiin Battulga (born 1963), President of Mongolia 
Khishigdalain Battulga (born 1974), Mongolian football defender
Zorigtyn Battulga (born 1986), Mongolian football forward

Mongolian given names